Ghosts Can't Do It is a 1989 American romantic crime fantasy comedy film, the last film written and directed by John Derek, and starring Bo Derek with Anthony Quinn.

Real estate magnate Donald Trump appears as himself and received a Golden Raspberry Award for Worst Supporting Actor. Trump, along with Leo Damian, was also nominated for the Worst New Star category, but both lost to Sofia Coppola in The Godfather Part III. The film also won the Golden Raspberry Award for Worst Picture, Worst Actress (Bo Derek) and Worst Director (John Derek). The film was a box office disappointment and received negative reviews.

Plot 
Katie is married to elderly billionaire Scott. In spite of their 30-year age difference, the two are deeply in love and live an active, fun-filled life, including passionate and frequent sex. While the two are horseback riding, Scott suffers a heart attack. He survives, but the couple is devastated to learn that he will no longer be able to have sex. Scott is denied a heart transplant due to his advanced age. Choosing to die on his own terms rather than live on borrowed time, Scott commits suicide.

Ascending to the afterlife, Scott is met by a fledging guardian angel (Julie Newmar). As Scott is the first soul in her care, the angel is uncertain of her role and Scott manages to persuade her to let him return to Earth as a ghost in order to be near the grieving Katie. Katie is the only one who can see or hear Scott's ghost. The two are frustrated by their inability to make physical contact (specifically, they can't have sex). Scott comes up with a plan for Katie to commit murder so that Scott can possess her victim's body.

On the pretense of handling her late husband's business affairs around the world, Katie uses her inheritance to travel in search of the perfect victim. Scott encourages her to have sex with each potential victim so that both of them will know if the body is compatible sexually. Eventually the two settle on a young, handsome man named Fausto. Katie has sex multiple times with Fausto while steeling herself to murder him, but the more intimate they become, the more difficult Katie finds the idea of killing him. Scott grows impatient that she keeps putting off the murder and questions if she has fallen in love with Fausto.

However, while on a snorkeling trip with Katie, Fausto is caught in a fishing net underwater and accidentally drowns. In an apparent contradiction, Scott is unable to possess Fausto's dead body. Katie revives Fausto with CPR, and Scott is able to possess the now-living body. Katie marries "Fausto", now permanently possessed by Scott.

Cast 
 Bo Derek as Katie Scott (née O'Dare)
 Anthony Quinn as Scott
 Leo Damian as Fausto
 Julie Newmar as Angel
 Don Murray as Winston
 Mickey Knox as The Pill Man
 Donald Trump as himself

Reception

Critical response 
A TV Guide review of the film described it as "the worst-ever movie from John and Bo Derek, which makes it one of the low points of what passes for civilization in the 20th century". Asawin Suebsaeng of The Daily Beast wrote that the film "features one of the dumbest, least funny rape jokes in modern movie history".

Donald Trump's performance in the film was criticized. Mick LaSalle of the San Francisco Chronicle compared his mannerisms in the film to those of Benito Mussolini, and Michael Kennedy of Screen Rant wrote: "Whether one loves Trump or hates him, he's certainly a charismatic presence, but an actor he isn't".

Accolades

Home media 
It was released on Blu-ray by Shout Factory alongside the 1984 Razzie-winning Bolero as a double feature.

See also 
 List of films considered the worst
 Home Alone 2: Lost in New York (1992) – another Trump-related film
 Ghost (1990) – Academy Award-winning supernatural film starring Patrick Swayze and Demi Moore

References

External links 
 
 Excerpts
 Trailer

1989 films
1980s crime comedy films
1980s fantasy comedy films
1989 romantic comedy films
American crime comedy films
American fantasy comedy films
American independent films
American romantic comedy films
Films about death
Films about suicide
Films shot in Hong Kong
Films shot in Sri Lanka
Films shot in the Maldives
Films shot in Wyoming
American ghost films
Films about spirit possession
Films directed by John Derek
1980s ghost films
1989 independent films
Films with screenplays by John Derek
Golden Raspberry Award winning films
Romantic crime films
1980s English-language films
1980s American films